The Allahabad Observatory located in the suburb of Jhusi, just outside Allahabad is the centre responsible for maintaining the Indian Standard Time. The observatory is located at 82.5°E longitude, which translates to an exact time difference of 5 hours and 30 minutes ahead of Coordinated Universal Time (UTC) i.e. UTC+05:30.

See also
 List of astronomical observatories

References

Astronomical observatories in India
Buildings and structures in Allahabad
Tourist attractions in Allahabad